The first world record in the men's 400 metres hurdles was recognised by the International Association of Athletics Federations in 1912. That inaugural record was the performance by Charles Bacon at the 1908 Olympics.

Three athletes, all from the United States, have had long-standing records. Glenn Hardin broke the world record three times and was the record holder for over 21 years, between 1932 and 1953. Edwin Moses set his first record in 1976 and improved his own world record three times. He held the record from 1976 until 1992, when it was beaten by Kevin Young with a time of 46.78 seconds at the 1992 Barcelona Olympics.

Young’s record stood for 29 years, until Karsten Warholm broke it during the Diamond League event at his homefield of Bislett during Bislett games in 2021. The new world record was at 46.70. On August 3, 2021, Warholm broke his record again in the Tokyo Olympics 400 meter hurdle final. The new world record is now at 45.94.

As of June 21, 2009, 21 world records have been ratified by the IAAF in the event.

Progression 1912–76

"y" denotes time for 440 yards (402.34 m) which was ratified as a world record in this event.

The "Time" column indicates the ratified mark; the "Auto" column indicates a fully automatic time that was also recorded in the event when hand-timed marks were used for official records, or which was the basis for the official mark, rounded to the 10th of a second, depending on the rules then in place.

Progression post-1976

From 1975, the IAAF accepted separate automatically electronically timed records for events up to 400 metres. Starting January 1, 1977, the IAAF required fully automatic timing to the hundredth of a second for these events.

John Akii-Bua's 1972 Olympic gold medal run was the fastest recorded fully electronic 400 metre race to that time, at 47.82.

See also
Women's 400 metres hurdles world record progression
Hurdling

References

External links
400 Metres Hurdles All Time List from the IAAF

400 m hurdles, men
World record